Percival Edmund Wentworth Ford (November 25, 1946 – July 8, 1980) was a Bahamian professional baseball player. Ford's professional career lasted for ten complete seasons (1966–75), all spent in the Atlanta Braves' organization. He appeared in four Major League Baseball games for the  Braves.

The fourth of six Major Leaguers to be born in the Bahamas, Ford played both baseball and cricket as a youth. He signed with the Braves as an undrafted free agent and was promoted to the Major Leagues in September 1973 after his eighth season in the Atlanta farm system, when he won 17 of 24 decisions with an earned run average of 2.46 with the Braves' two top minor league affiliates.

In his Major League debut on September 10, 1973, he started against the San Francisco Giants at Atlanta–Fulton County Stadium. Opposing future Baseball Hall of Fame pitcher Juan Marichal, Ford threw a complete game, 10–4 triumph, surrendering five hits (four of them singles) and six bases on balls, with three strikeouts. He also cracked two singles in four at bats.  Five days later, he appeared in 3⅔ innings pitched in relief against the Cincinnati Reds, allowing only two hits and one earned run, but that run came on a ninth-inning, walk-off home run to Tony Pérez to saddle Ford with a loss.  He was ineffective in his next two outings, one each as a reliever and starter, and finished his MLB career with a 1–2 record, with 17 hits and eight bases on balls allowed, with four strikeouts, in 16⅓ innings pitched.

Ford died at age 33 in an automobile accident in Nassau after apparently falling asleep at the wheel of his car while driving home from work. He became the first Major League Baseball player to die in the Bahamas.

References

External links

1946 births
1980 deaths
Atlanta Braves players
Bahamian expatriate baseball players in the United States
Greenwood Braves players
Gulf Coast Braves players
Major League Baseball players from the Bahamas
Major League Baseball pitchers
Richmond Braves players
Road incident deaths in the Bahamas
Savannah Braves players
Shreveport Braves players
Sportspeople from Nassau, Bahamas
West Palm Beach Braves players